The N51 road is a national secondary road in Ireland. 
West to east, it starts in Delvin, County Westmeath at a junction with the N52. It passes through Athboy, a junction with M3 motorway, Navan and Slane, where it crosses the N2 road, all in County Meath, before crossing the M1 motorway and terminating near Drogheda in County Louth at a roundabout on the R132.

It is an unusual arrangement for a national secondary road to terminate at a regional road. However the R132 is the former N1 route (now by-passed by the M1 motorway) and is of a higher standard than most regional roads.

Upgrade
On 15 May 2009 Phase 2B of the N51 Navan Inner Relief Road was opened to traffic. This route provides a direct link between the N3/M3 Kells Road and the N51 Athboy Road. On the same day a further 3.9 kilometres of the realigned N51 which has been constructed as part of the M3 motorway scheme was opened to traffic, 2.5 kilometres of which is Type 1 dual carriageway.

See also
Roads in Ireland 
Motorways in Ireland
National primary road
Regional road

References
Roads Act 1993 (Classification of National Roads) Order 2006 – Department of Transport

National secondary roads in the Republic of Ireland
Roads in County Westmeath
Roads in County Meath
Roads in County Louth